Eugenia excisa is a species of plant in the family Myrtaceae. It is endemic to eastern Cuba.

The species is listed as vulnerable.

References

Endemic flora of Cuba
excisa
Vulnerable plants
Plants described in 1923